Vaqueras de Bayamón is the professional female volleyball team of Bayamón, Puerto Rico.

Squads

Current
''As of April 2011
 Head Coach:  Luis Aponte
 Assistant coach:  Gerardo Batista

Release or Transfer

References

External links
 League Official website
 Team website
 2005 Squad

Puerto Rican volleyball clubs
Volleyball clubs established in 2001
2001 establishments in Puerto Rico
Sports in Bayamón, Puerto Rico